Laird is a hereditary title in Scotland.

Laird or Lairds may also refer to:

People
Laird (given name)
Laird (surname)

Places

Antarctica
Cape Laird, Ross Dependency
Laird Glacier, Ross Dependency
Laird Plateau, Oates Land

Canada
Laird, Ontario, a township and village
Laird, Saskatchewan, a village
Rural Municipality of Laird No. 404, Saskatchewan, a rural municipality

United States
Laird, Colorado, a census-designated place
Laird Township, Michigan
Laird Township, Phelps County, Nebraska
Lairds Creek, a river in Kansas
Hopewell, Benton County, Mississippi, formerly Laird, an unincorporated community

Outer space
16192 Laird, a main-belt asteroid

Enterprises
Laird & Company, a New Jersey distillery that is the oldest in the United States
Laird plc, a British electronics and technology business

Schools
Laird School of Art, Birkenhead, Merseyside, England